Ethan Daniel Van Sciver (born September 3, 1974) is an American comics artist and social media personality. He is known for illustrating or drawing covers for a number of superhero titles in the 2000s, primarily for DC Comics, including Green Lantern and The Flash: Rebirth, and New X-Men for Marvel Comics. In the late 2010s he became known for his "ComicArtistPro Secrets" channel on YouTube, through which he became a central figure in Comicsgate.

Early life
Ethan Van Sciver was born September 3, 1974 in Utah. He and his younger brother, alternative cartoonist Noah Van Sciver, grew up in Merchantville in southern New Jersey, and he graduated from Pennsauken High School in 1992.

Van Sciver decided on a career in the comic-book field after seeing the 1978 movie Superman as a child, but only began to read comics intently with John Byrne's The Man of Steel in 1986. He cites Chris Claremont and Jon Bogdanove's Fantastic Four vs. the X-Men (1987) as a strong influence.

Career
While in high school, Van Sciver did various art-related jobs, which included painting murals of Native Americans, drawing caricatures for mall customers, illustrating children's books, and airbrushing t-shirts.

Van Sciver's first comics work was published in 1994, writing and drawing what he later called "a horrible little character called Cyberfrog", published by Hall of Heroes and later Harris Comics.

Mainstream publishers
His first work for DC Comics was in 1998, which led to him being hired in 1999 as the artist on the series Impulse, with writer Todd Dezago. This was followed in 2001 by the first of what would become several collaborations with writer Geoff Johns, on the superhero-horror one-shot The Flash: Iron Heights.

Van Sciver was hired by Marvel Comics in 2001 to work on New X-Men, a retitled and revamped series (beginning with #114) written by Grant Morrison. The series' primary artist Frank Quitely was not expected to illustrate the necessary twelve issues per year, so Van Sciver was scheduled to illustrate two issues per year, which expanded to more issues as Igor Kordey was also hired as a semi-regular artist. Van Sciver drew a total of four issues. In issue #133 of this series, Morrison and Van Sciver co-created the character Dust, a Sunni Muslim mutant who can transform into sand.

Returning to work primarily for DC, Van Sciver worked with Johns on the six-issue miniseries Green Lantern: Rebirth (2004) which restored the Silver Age character Hal Jordan as the publisher's primary Green Lantern. They then worked together on an ongoing series featuring the character. During this time Van Sciver was one of the artists who contributed to a series of instructional books for amateur comics artists, published by Wizard magazine.

In 2006, Van Sciver penciled the cover art for metal band Winger's fourth studio album. The cover art was also sold as a poster called "Guardian of Freedom".

Johns, Van Sciver, Dave Gibbons, Ivan Reis, and others produced "Sinestro Corps War", a high-profile 11-issue story appearing in DC's two Green Lantern monthly series in 2007. Van Sciver and Johns produced the six-issue mini-series The Flash: Rebirth (2009) which – like the earlier Green Lantern mini-series – reintroduced the Silver Age character Barry Allen as the Flash. The same year, he drew variant covers for DC's crossover storyline Blackest Night. In 2011, as part of DC's "New 52" initiative, he was the artist – and co-writer with Gail Simone – of The Fury of Firestorm: The Nuclear Men. Starting in 2016, as part of the "DC Rebirth" relaunch of DC's titles, Van Sciver drew issues of the Hal Jordan and the Green Lantern Corps series.

Van Sciver received a "special thanks" credit in the films Justice League, Zack Snyder's Justice League, and The Suicide Squad.

Independent work
In 2017, Van Sciver penciled illustrations for 12 Rules for Life: An Antidote to Chaos, a self-help book by Canadian psychologist and social activist Jordan Peterson. No longer employed by DC, in 2018 Van Sciver announced that he would instead produce his own comics, and in 2019 he published Cyberfrog: Bloodhoney featuring his early character Cyberfrog, for which he had raised over $500,000 through crowdfunding. A campaign in 2020 raised over $1 million for a follow-up Cyberfrog: Rekt Planet, promised to ship in 2021.

Right-wing conservatism
In 2017, Van Sciver began a YouTube channel called ComicArtistPro Secrets, which originally featured demonstrations of illustration tools and techniques, but which later focused on commentary about comics, other comics creators, and fan culture. Through that channel, Van Sciver became a central figure in Comicsgate, an alt-right movement in opposed to what its participants see as forced political themes and anti-consumer practices in current mainstream superhero comics, such as cultural diversity and progressive politics. The movement has been criticized for harassment tactics in online campaigns against those who produce these comics and work in the industry. Van Sciver faced criticism over an announced collaboration with cartoonist Dave Sim, whose views about women have been described by critics as misogynist. Van Sciver initially defended Sim's past relationship with a 14-year-old girl, likening it to that of Elvis and Priscilla Presley, until he learned more details about Sim's relationship with her, and cancelled the project.

Van Sciver has also been a prominent figure in the Fandom Menace, a Star Wars fan movement with similar goals and methods to Comicsgate. In 2018, Van Sciver expressed his displeasure at the direction that the franchise had taken by producing a video of himself opening and destroying action figures of The Last Jedi character Rose Tico.

Following the 2021 Atlanta spa shootings, in which eight people, including six Asian women, were killed, Van Sciver referenced the incident during a livestream group discussion on film director Zack Snyder, commenting, "He'll never stop me from killing Chinese people, ever. I don't care how many movies he makes. Give me a Tommy Gun and line them up against the wall, as the great Stan Lee once said."

In March 2023 Van Sciver publicly criticized actor Pedro Pascal for not having defended his Mandalorian co-star Gina Carano when Lucasfilm fired her from that series in 2021 for comments that were interpreted as a comparison of treatment of American conservatives to Jews in Nazi Germany. During the March 12, 2023 telecast of the 95th Academy Awards, Van Sciver reacted to the appearance of Pascal, who is Chilean-American, presenting an award with actress Elizabeth Olsen, by tweeting a screenshot of them with the caption "Oh, it’s this asshole. Thanks for standing behind Gina, you flabby coward." The tweet drew backlash from Chilean Twitter users, resulting in thousands of comments crticial of Van Sciver's original tweet. Van Sciver responded to this by posting recipes and other phrases in Spanish, and tweeting the following day, "I seem to have pissed off Chile last night. Lmfao. My bad."

Awards and recognition
 Inkwell Awards Ambassador (2010–2018)
 2008 Will Eisner Comic Industry Awards – nominee for Best Penciller/Inker for Green Lantern: Sinestro Corps

Personal life
As of August 2005, Van Sciver resided in Orlando, Florida, where he lived for several years. As of May 2015 he lived in North Carolina, but was in the process of moving back to New Jersey to be with his girlfriend Andrea, whom he met when he was 18.

He is a Republican and a former Mormon.

Bibliography
As artist unless otherwise noted.

Non-fiction
 12 Rules for Life: An Antidote to Chaos by Jordan Peterson (2018), illustrations

Splatto Comics
 Jawbreakers: Lost Souls TPB (2019), cover art
 Jawbreakers: GØD-K1NG TPB (2019), cover art

ALL CAPS Comics
 Cyberfrog: Bloodhoney (2019), artist and writer
 Cyberfrog: The Diary of Heather Swain (2019), artist and writer
 Cyberfrog: Unfrogettable Tales #1–2 (2020), artist and writer

DC Comics

 52 #39, 43 (backup features) (2007–2008)
 52 Aftermath:The Four Horsemen #1–6 (2008)
 Batman/Catwoman: Trail of the Gun, miniseries, #1–2 (2004)
 Batman and Robin Annual #1 (2013)
 Batman Incorporated Special #1 (2013)
 Batman: The Dark Knight vol. 2 #16–18, 21, 28–29 (2013–2014)
 Batman: The Dawnbreaker, one-shot (2017)
 Convergence #8 (2015)
 Countdown #28 (backup feature) (2007)
 DC Comics Presents: Impulse #1 (2011)
 DC Universe: Rebirth #1 (2016)
 DC Universe: Secret Origins #1 (2012)
 The Flash 80-Page Giant (Impulse) #1 (1998)
 The Flash: Iron Heights (2001)
 The Flash: Rebirth, miniseries, #1–6 (2009–2010)
 Fury of Firestorm: The Nuclear Men #7–8 (co-writer/artist); #1–6, 9–10 (co-writer only) (2012)
 Green Lantern vol. 4 #1 (with Carlos Pacheco); #4–5, 9 (full art); #25 (with Ivan Reis) (2005–2008)
 Green Lantern vol. 5 #20, 43, Annual #1 (2012)
 Green Lantern/New Gods: Godhead #1 (2014)
 Green Lantern: Rebirth, miniseries, #1–6 (2004–2005)
 Green Lantern: Secret Files & Origins (2005)
 Green Lantern: Sinestro Corps Special #1 (2007)
 Green Lantern Corps: Edge of Oblivion, miniseries, #1–3 (2016)
 Green Lanterns: Rebirth, one-shot (2016)
 Hal Jordan and the Green Lantern Corps: Rebirth, one-shot (2016)
 Hal Jordan and the Green Lantern Corps #4–5, 8, 12, 15, 17, 22–25, 32, 38, 42, 45 (2016–2018)
 Hawkman vol. 4 #13 (2003)
 Impulse #41, 50–52, 54–58, 62–63, 65–67 (1998–2000)
 JLA Secret Files #3 (among other artists) (2000)
 Justice League vol. 2 #0 (2012)
 Justice Leagues: JL?, one-shot (2001)
 Justice League of America vol. 2 #20 (2006)
 Justice Society of America #59–64 (2004)
 The New 52: Futures End (Free Comic Book Day) #0 (various artists) (2014)
 Sinestro #15–16 (2015)
 Superman/Batman #28–30 (2006)
 Secret Origins 80-Page Giant (Wonder Girl) #1 (1998)
 Sensation Comics featuring Wonder Woman #1 (2014)
 Untold Tales of Blackest Night #1 (among other artists) (2010)
 War of the Supermen (Free Comic Book Day) #0 (among other artists) (2010)

Hall of Heroes
 CyberFrog #1–2 (1994), writer/artist
 Fuzzy Buzzard and Friends (April, 1995), writer/artist

Harris Comics
 CyberFrog Vol 2 #0–4 (1996), writer/artist
 CyberFrog : Censored #1 (1996) one-shot, writer/artist
 CyberFrog: Reservoir Frog #1–2 (1996) miniseries, writer/artist
 CyberFrog vs Creed #1 (1997); CyberFrog (co-writer/artist)
 CyberFrog: 3rd Anniversary #1–2 (1997) Special miniseries, writer/artist
 CyberFrog: The Origin - Ashcan Preview #1 (1997) one-shot, writer/artist
 CyberFrog: Amphibionix #1 (1999) one-shot, writer/artist
 Vampirella: Crossover Gallery #1 (1997)
 Vampirella / Shadowhawk: Creatures of the Night (1995) #1

Marvel Comics
 Deadpool Classics TPB The Day the World Got Ill #20
 Heroes Reborn: Remnants 1
 Heroes Reborn: The Return TPB 1
 New X-Men TPB 1–4
 New X-Men Omnibus (HC) 1
 X-Men (II) • New X-Men (I) • X-Men Legacy (I) #117–118, 123, 133
 Heroes Reborn Remnants #1 (2000)
 Heroes Reborn The Return #1 (1997)
 New X-Men #117–118, 123, 133 (2001–2002)
 Weapon X Omnibus (HC): The Return #1
 Weapon X TPB (I) #1
 Weapon X: The Draft – Wild Child (2002)
 Wolverine #179 (2002)

Cover work
 Heroes Reborn Remnants #1
 New X-Men TPB By Grant Morrison Ultimate Collection 2
 X-Men (II) • New X-Men (I) • X-Men Legacy (I) #124–125, 128, 130–131, 134, 146

WildStorm
 Claw of the Conquered #1a, 1b (2006–2007) (cover artist)

Wizard
  (co-writer)
  (co-writer)
  (co-writer)
  (co-writer)

References

External links
 
 
 Ethan Van Sciver Portfolio on Comicbookrealm.com
 
 
 Ethan Van Sciver on Twitter

Interviews
 Interview with Comic Geek Speak Podcast (August 2009)
 Ethan Van Sciver on the Super Hero Speak podcast Sep 26, 2017

1974 births
American comics artists
American media critics
American YouTubers
Commentary YouTubers
DC Comics people
Florida Republicans
Marvel Comics people
Latter Day Saints from Florida
Latter Day Saints from New Jersey
Latter Day Saints from Utah
Living people
New Jersey Republicans
Pennsauken High School alumni
People from Merchantville, New Jersey
Utah Republicans
YouTube channels launched in 2008